The Last Performance is a 1929 American film directed by Paul Fejos and starring Conrad Veidt and Mary Philbin. The film was made in two version: a silent version and Movietone version complete with music, talking sequences, and sound effects with the talking sequences were confined only to the last reel.

Premise
Conrad Veidt stars as Erik the Great, a sinister stage magician who is in love with a woman half his age, Julie, played by Mary Philbin. A young thief, Mark Royce (played by Fred MacKaye) is caught stealing from Erik's apartment and is taken in at Julie's suggestion. Secretly she falls in love with the new apprentice. However, Erik's other apprentice, Buffo (played by Leslie Fenton) becomes aware of Julie's love for Mark, and driven by jealousy tells Erik. Buffo is later found killed, and Mark is the prime suspect.

Cast
 Conrad Veidt as Erik the Great
 Mary Philbin as Julie Fergeron
 Leslie Fenton as Buffo Black
 Fred MacKaye as Mark Royce (credited as Fred Mac Kaye)
 Eddie Boland as Agent
 Anders Randolf as Judge
 Sam De Grasse as District Attorney
 Gusztáv Pártos as Theatre Manager (as Gustav Paros)
 William H. Turner as Booking Agent
 George Irving as Defense Attorney

Production
According to the Exhibitors Herald and Moving Picture World, filming began on July 30, 1928 withwroking titles that included The Play Goes On and The Last Call.  The film made use of set from The Phantom of the Opera (1925).  The film was made in both Silent and sound versions, with the now lost dialogue version having 272 feet more film than the silent one.

Both Veidt's and Philbin's contracts with Universal were cancelled before the film's release.

Michael R. Pitts described the style of the film as not being a horror film, but "a dark drama with genre overtones".

Release
The film debuted in October 1929.  It was released in Great Britain as Erik the Great. Surviving silent prints of The Last Performance run between 48 and less than 60 minutes.

In 2012, The Criterion Collection included The Last Performance and a reconstructed sound version of Broadway as extra features on the DVD and Blu-ray release of Fejos' 1928 film, Lonesome. The silent version was released by the Criterion Collection on Blu-ray and DVD with Fejos' Lonesome in August 2012. The DVD release runs about 59 minutes.

Reception
From contemporary review, a review in Hollywood Filmography praised the film saying "its outstanding quality is the performance of Veidt, which is one of the most efective the American screen has witnessed" and that "the photography  was most effective, and the settings macabre enough to carry out the gruesome action and drama." The Boston Herald reported that Veidt was "a master of subtle and telling pantomime, his gesture are eloquent in their dark simplicity and his face is one of the most interesting and expressive that we [have] ever seen." A review in The New York Times commented that "Fejos has handled his scenes with no small digress of imagination. While some of the straight camera work is not up to scratch, there are number of photographic feats that are quite effective."

Conversely, Photoplay declared it "a much over-acted and over-directed film" while Variety stated that it was "one of the draggiest pictures made with the photography of the poorest. Apparently, Paul Fejos was up against handicaps at the star, with a story that is more foreign than domestic in brand, eh sought to give it the German touch." Harrison's Reports summarized the film as "Good acting, but mediocre entertainment. The story is somewhat gruesome."

Pitts praised Veidt's performance, stating he gave a "tour de force performance as Erik, imbuing the character with multiple characteristics, including mystery, tenderness, philanthropy and vengeance." and that the actor was matched by Mary Philbin.

References

Sources

External links

 
New York Times - plot description

American silent feature films
1929 films
1929 drama films
American black-and-white films
1929 romance films
1920s English-language films
Films about magic and magicians
Films directed by Paul Fejos
Transitional sound films
Universal Pictures films
1920s American films
Silent American drama films
Silent romantic drama films
American romantic horror films
American romantic drama films
American films about revenge
Melodramas